William S. Derrick (1802 – May 15, 1852) was an American politician from Pennsylvania. He held the post of Chief Clerk of the U.S. State Department four distinct times in the 1840s and 1850s. He held the post of Secretary of State ad interim for three days in 1843 (June 21 to June 23).

References

1802 births
1852 deaths
Pennsylvania politicians
Chief Clerks of the United States Department of State
Acting United States Secretaries of State